Rhamnus globosa, the lokao, is a species of plant in the family Rhamnaceae.

References

globosa
Taxa named by Alexander von Bunge